Michal Dutkiewicz (born 1955) is an Australian professional illustrator and comic book artist based in Adelaide. The son of artist Wladyslaw Dutkiewicz, Dutkiewicz has worked on a variety of comic book titles, including Lost in Space (with actor and writer Bill Mumy), Wolverine: Doombringer, Batman Forever and Superman, as well as an illustrator on works such as Angelwitch, Book 1: Dragonscarpe  and Angelwitch, Book 2: Triumvirate, with author Pat McNamara and conceptulist Gary Turner, for publisher Angel Phoenix Media and The Picture, a popular Australian men's magazine.

Awards
 Stanley Award (Adventure /Illustrated Strip Artist), 1991.
 Stanley Award (Adventure /Illustrated Strip Artist), 1995.
 Stanley Award (Adventure /Illustrated Strip Artist), 1998.
 Royal South Australian Society Of Arts Award (Best Painting)

Selected bibliography

References

External links
 Michal Dutkiewicz: Illustrator
 
 

Australian painters
Australian comics artists
1955 births
Living people